Shiva Bhagwati Temple Akingam  is a temple of Jagad Amba Shri Shiva Bhagwati. The temple is famous in Kashmir valley

The shrine of Goddess Shiva Bhagwati is situated at the top of the village near the foothills of a big forest full of Devdar trees and  pastures. The temple is at a distance of about 250 meters from main chowk Akingam and 100 meters from G H S S Akingam .
It is the only one of the four shrines in the state of Jammu and Kashmir that has been assigned a chunk of forest land as Jagir which stands within its revenue records.

Celebration
Every year the day of Bhagwati ji is celebrated with religious zeal and fervour. Kashmiri pandits come from different parts of country to celebrate this day. But this celebration has lost the glamour it used to have in the past .

See also
 Achabal
 Akingam
 Kumar Mohalla Akingam

References

External links
 http://trawellguide.com/travel-guide-destination.php?id=930&title=Shiva_Bhagwati_at_Akingam
 http://www.scoopnews.in/det.aspx?q=21949ory

Hindu temples in Jammu and Kashmir
Akingam